Henry Putzel Jr. (October 8, 1913 – September 2, 2013) was an American lawyer and the thirteenth Reporter of Decisions of the United States Supreme Court, serving from 1964 to 1979.

Born in Denver, Colorado, he received his B.A. from Yale University in 1935 and his law degree from Yale in 1938.  He practiced law in St. Louis, Missouri from 1938 to 1941.  During World War II, he worked for the Federal government at the Office of Price Administration (1942–1945) and the United States Department of Justice's Foreign Agents Registration Section (1945–1948).  At Justice he also worked on desegregation and civil rights cases in the Civil Rights Division where he was eventually head of the Elections Section prior to being recommended to Chief Justice Earl Warren for the position of reporter of decisions.

Putzel said the ideal reporter must be a lawyer, a "word nut", and a "double revolving peripatetic nit-picker."

Putzel died in Peterborough, New Hampshire on September 2, 2013, at the age of 99.

References

Reporters of Decisions of the Supreme Court of the United States
Missouri lawyers
1913 births
2013 deaths
American civil rights lawyers
Yale Law School alumni
20th-century American lawyers